Cho Mi-yeon (born January 31, 1997), better known mononymously as Miyeon, is a South Korean singer and actress. She is the main vocalist of the South Korean girl group (G)I-dle under Cube Entertainment, and voiced Ahri in the virtual K-pop girl group K/DA.

Early life 
Cho was born on January 31, 1997. She is the only child in the family. Cho showed a strong interest in singing since she was a child. Her love for music was inspired by her father. Cho's parents soon recognized her passion and sent her to music schools to learn various skills, such as violin, guitar, and piano. She eventually auditioned for YG Entertainment in middle school and went on to spend the next five years as a trainee. However, her debut was thwarted and she left the company.

Cho continued to pursue music as she signed up for a music academy to strengthen her vocal skills, as well as learning to compose and produce music. Cho spent about eight years as a trainee before debuting with (G)I-dle.

Career

2016–2018: Pre-debut activities 
In early 2017, Cho became a trainee at Cube Entertainment. Before joining Cube, she was a freelance singer and appeared as an associate singer with Lim Seul-ong in Urban Zakapa's Canada Tour in September 2016. In 2017, she appeared in a small part in Lim Seul-ong's "You" music video.

2018–2020: Debut with (G)I-dle, collaborations and acting debut 

Cho debuted with (G)I-dle on May 2, 2018, with their mini-album I Am and the title song "Latata".

On October 26, 2018, it was confirmed that Cho would perform at the League of Legends World Finals Opening Ceremony 2018, along with Soyeon, Madison Beer and Jaira Burns. The four singers provided vocals for the virtual K-pop girl group K/DA, with Miyeon voicing Ahri, one of the most well known champions in the League of Legends. Together with Evelynn voiced by Beer, Ahri is the main vocalist of the group. Their song "Pop/Stars" went viral on YouTube and topped Billboard'''s World Digital Songs chart.

In 2019, Cho collaborated with Hangzoo with the song "Cart" as part of Amoeba Culture X Devine Channel Code Share Project.

In 2020, Cho appeared on MBC's music competition program King of Mask Singer. She went on to win the first round with 64 points. In the second round, she performed Yoon Mi-rae's "Goodbye Sadness and Hello Happiness" but lost to Im Kang-sung. Her vocal performance received a warm reception from both audience and panels. Cho's voice was described as smokey, but soulful. Also that year, Cho sang again as Ahri on two songs from K/DA's EP, All Out; lead single "The Baddest" with Bea Miller and Wolftyla replacing Beer and Burns, and the second single "More" with the original line-up and Lexie Liu.

In September 2020, it was revealed that Cho would make her acting debut as the female lead in web-drama Replay: The Moment as Yoo Hayoung, a popular YouTuber and band vocalist. She has a cold and chic personality, but a generous and kind-hearted person. The drama depicts an empathetic romance in a clumsy and anxious, but dreams and love of reliving past emotions in the present eighteen youth. With the drama's musical nature, Cho released several OSTs for it: "Dreaming About You" and "How To Love (with Neon Paprika)". The drama went on and recorded more than 6 million cumulative views.

In October 2020, Cho sung "We Already Fell In Love" together with Minnie as part of Do Do Sol Sol La La Sol  soundtrack, and in November, Cho released her first solo OST "My Destiny" as part of Tale of the Nine Tailed soundtrack.

On November 30, 2020, Cho appeared in Seoul Connects U, a variety travel show jointly planned and produced by MBC and Seoul Tourism Foundation. The program shows a time slip trip in the same space and at different times to global fans by linking the past and present of Seoul through photos of stars and fans in real-time.

2021–present: DJ host, M.C and solo endeavors
In February 2021, it was announced that Cho was chosen to be the main host of Naver  Now radio program Gossip Idle, hosting the radio weekly every Tuesday at 8 pm from February 9. The radio show was initially aired as a trilogy to commemorate the comeback of (G)I-dle's fourth mini album I Burn in January, due to the response from fans, it has returned to the official live show. In the same month, Cho was appointed as one of the new hosts of Mnet's music program M Countdown, a position which she held from February 18 with actor Nam Yoon-su. She became the first female MC on the program in 9 years. On the day of their first broadcast, the pair prepared a special stage as they sang a duet song "Dream" by Suzy and Baekhyun. At the end of the month, Cho succeeded in making the list of Korean Business Research Institute's monthly "Individual Girl Group Members Brand Power Ranking" at number 3 with an increase of 96.20% behind Blackpink's Jennie and Rosé.

In May 2021, Cho appeared on Kingdom: Legendary War as a hidden card to help BtoB's "Blue Moon (Cinema Ver)" No Limit stage. The stage was presented as a musical-like stage with the concept of the movie La La Land and Once Upon a Time in Hollywood with Cho's role caught in a love storyline between Minhyuk and Changsub.

On May 28, Korean media news shared that Cho participated in CS Happy Entertainment's cs numbers album with "You Were My Breath", a pop-ballad song played by a 60-member orchestra including Joseph K, who created Paul Kim's "Me After You" and guitarist Park Shin-won. The song is produced by Rocoberry who produce the 2017 hit song "I Will Go to You Like the First Snow". The album is produced by Jeon Chang-sik, the CEO of CS Happy Entertainment recognized Cho's potential and lived up to his expectations with her unrivalled singing skills that have not been revealed yet in (G)I-dle. With one day of tracking, it debuted at number 96 on Gaon Download Chart and number 20 on the component BGM Chart.

In August 2021, Maeil Business Newspaper reported that Cho would be acting alongside The Penthouse: War in Life actor Lee Tae-vin in the action comedy web series Delivery, which was released in November 2021. She is to play the role of Kwak Doo-sik, a delivery girl who is well versed in martial arts. The singer is said to appear in this web drama to help local small and medium-sized enterprises during difficult times due to COVID-19 in the Gyeonggi Province and the production staff stated, "to look forward to wire action from Cho Mi-yeon".

In October 2021, Cho released a collaboration with Raiden on his first EP, Love Right Back, with the lead single "Side Effect" released on October 11. It was described as a medium-tempo synth-pop song with witty lyrics that expresses the emotions felt by the person in love as a side effect. She also co-featured on Lee Donghae's B-side track, "Blue Moon", which was released on October 13. The same day, she was confirmed to star in the upcoming pink comedy web series Adult Trainee as Bang Ye-kyung alongside Ryu Ui-hyun. On November 17, 2021, Cho was featured in rapper Kid Milli's "Kitty".

On April 6, 2022, it was announced that Cho would make her solo debut at the end of April. On April 8, 2022, Cube Entertainment announced that her first EP, My, would be released on April 27, including the lead single "Drive". Cho won her first music program trophy at SBS MTV's The Show'' on May 3.

Discography

Extended plays

Singles

Other charted songs

Songwriting credits 
All song credits are adapted from the Korea Music Copyright Association's database unless stated otherwise.

Filmography

Film

Web series

Television shows

Web shows

Hosting

Radio shows

Music videos

Awards and nominations

Notes

References

External links 

 

1997 births
Living people
(G)I-dle members
Cube Entertainment artists
K/DA members
People from Incheon
Musicians from Incheon
English-language singers from South Korea
Japanese-language singers of South Korea
Mandarin-language singers of South Korea
South Korean female idols
South Korean pop singers
South Korean women pop singers
South Korean web series actresses
K-pop singers
21st-century South Korean women singers
21st-century South Korean singers